Lieutenant Colonel Michael Holmes (born 1965), U.S. Army National Guard, communicated alleged disclosures regarding use of information operations (IO) on visiting VIPs while Holmes was the leader of the Information Operations Forward Support Team at Camp Eggers in Kabul, Afghanistan.  Among the alleged targets were American Senators John McCain and Carl Levin, government ministers, and European diplomats. Media reports stated that the unit was subjected to a retaliatory campaign when it resisted the order to influence the targets, including a subsequent reprimand against LTC Holmes.

Holmes's national service began in the U.S. Army and the National Guard in 1985, and is a military intelligence officer with training in information operations.  He attended Admiral Farragut Academy in St. Petersburg, Florida (1978–1980), before graduating from Marine Military Academy in Harlingen, Texas, in 1983. He graduated from the University of Texas at Austin and was commissioned a Second Lieutenant in the US Army in 1987. He earned a Master of Arts in Diplomacy with a concentration in International Terrorism in 2008. He is a graduate of the U.S. Army Information Operations Qualification Course (2008), the U.S. Army Command and General Staff College (2007), the Military Intelligence Officer Transition Course (2002) and the Armor Officers Advanced Course (1994). He has served on active duty in Fort Drum, New York, and as a mobilized reservist in Afghanistan, Iraq and Kosovo.

References 

1965 births
Living people
People from Ocala, Florida
United States Army soldiers
American whistleblowers